The 1998 Catalan motorcycle Grand Prix was the twelfth round of the 1998 Grand Prix motorcycle racing season. It took place on 20 September 1998 at the Circuit de Catalunya. It was the last time that the Catalan Motorcycle Grand Prix was held in September  2020.

500 cc classification

250 cc classification

125 cc classification

Championship standings after the race (500cc)

Below are the standings for the top five riders and constructors after round twelve has concluded. 

Riders' Championship standings

Constructors' Championship standings

 Note: Only the top five positions are included for both sets of standings.

References

Catalan motorcycle Grand Prix
Catalan
Catalan Motorcycle Grand Prix
motorcycle